The Farman F.170 Jabiru was a 1925 single-engine airliner evolved from the F.121 Jabiru, built by the Farman Aviation Works.

Design and development
The F.170 Jabiru was a single-engine evolution of the 1923 F.3X/F.121. In the early 1920s, there was a strong prejudice in favour of single-engine airliners. Since even multi-engine aircraft could not keep flying in the likely event that an engine went out, it was considered that a single engine offered just as much security and a greater ease of maintenance.

The F.170 could carry up to 8 passengers and was an ungainly sesquiplane with a rectangular upper wing of constant profile. Its construction was of traditional wood and fabric. Since the aircraft was quite low on its wheels, it was often derisively called the ventre-à-terre (belly to the ground). The first flight took place in 1925.

The improved F.170bis, introduced in 1927, incorporated some metal construction and could carry 9 passengers. The F.171bis was joined by the one and only F.171.

Variants
F.170An 8-passenger sesquiplane powered by a  Farman 12 We engine, 13 built.
F.170bis9-passenger airliner; an F.170 incorporating some metal construction, four built.
F.171A long-range derivative developed for a crossing of the North Atlantic, one built.

Operational history
The F.170 and F.170bis were used exclusively by Société Générale des Transports Aériens (SGTA) from May 1926 and used on the Paris-Cologne-Berlin route. When the SGTA was incorporated in the newly created Air France airline on 7 October 1933, some five F.170 were still being used.

Operators

Air France
Société Générale des Transports Aériens

Specifications (F.170)

References

Bibliography

External links

 

1920s French airliners
Sesquiplanes
Single-engined tractor aircraft
F.0170